Alasdair David George Murray (born 6 September 1986), professionally known as Illy, is an Australian rapper from Frankston, Victoria. Illy first emerged onto the hip hop scene in 2009 and has released five studio albums and has won multiple ARIA Music Awards. Illy has performed at many Australian music festivals including headline spots at Groovin the Moo, Splendour in the Grass, Spilt Milk and Yours and Owls.

Early life
Alasdair David George Murray was born on 6 September 1986 in Frankston, Melbourne, Australia.

Career

2009–2011: Long Story Short and The Chase
Before his solo career, Illy was a member of Crooked Eye, but opted to leave the group.

Illy released his first album, Long Story Short in 2009. Long Story Short reached  No. 24 on the ARIA Top 40 Urban Albums chart and the lead single, "Pictures", was placed on national rotation on Triple J. In April 2010, Illy embarked on his first national headlining tour, playing 12 dates nationally. In September the same year, Illy toured nationally alongside Australian rappers 360 and Skryptcha for "The Three Up Tour". Illy featured on the track "Take It from Me" on producer M-Phazes' 2010 debut album Good Gracious.

In 2010, Illy released the singles "The Chase" and "Cigarettes" and in October 2010, released his second studio album The Chase. The Chase peaked at number 25 on the ARIA Charts. The album's third single, "It Can Wait" became Illy's first charting single on the Australian Singles Chart, peaking at number fifty-eight. In February 2011, Illy embarked on his 14-date nationwide "The Chase Tour", with special guest M-Phazes. In October 2011, "It Can Wait" was certified Gold by ARIA after selling 35,000 copies. At the ARIA Music Awards of 2011 The Chase was nominated for the ARIA Award for Best Urban Album.

2012–15: Bring It Back and Cinematic
In May 2012, Illy released "Heard It All", the lead single from his third studio album. In September 2012, Illy released his third album, Bring It Back, which peaked at number 15 on the ARIA Charts. Illy described the album as a "passion project" and a "tribute" to the Australian hip hop scene. A 24-date nationwide tour supported the release, with Australian hip-hop producer Chasm and Skryptcha as support acts.

At the ARIA Music Awards of 2013, Bring It Back won Illy his first ARIA Music Award, winning ARIA Award for Best Urban Album. In September 2013, Illy left Obese Records to set up his own label, ONETWO records, and signed South Australian hip hop artist Allday.

In November 2013, Illy released his fourth studio album, Cinematic. The album debuted at number 4 on the ARIA Charts. In March 2014, the album's fourth single "Tightrope" became Illy's first top 20 single, peaking at number 18.

2016–2021: Two Degrees and The Space Between
In July 2016, Illy released "Papercuts", featuring Vera Blue, which peaked at number 2 on the ARIA charts. At the ARIA Music Awards of 2016, the song was nominated for four awards. In October 2016, Illy released "Catch 22" featuring Anne-Marie, which peaked at number 11 on the ARIA charts. In November 2016, Illy released his fifth studio album, Two Degrees which debuted at No. 1 on the ARIA charts. At the ARIA Music Awards of 2017, the album was nominated for three awards. "You Say When" and "Oh My" were released as singles in 2017. Illy toured the album and won ARIA Award for Best Australian Live Act at the ARIA Music Awards of 2017.

On 24 May 2019, Illy released "Then What"; his first new release in 2 years. Singles "Codes" and "Lean on Me" followed in 2019. On 13 February 2020, Illy released "Last Laugh"

On 22 May 2020, Australian radio station Triple J premiered a new song by Illy titled "Parmas In June", created as part of a COVID-19 self-isolation musical challenge nicknamed Quarantune.

The Space Between was released in 2021.

2022: return to Warner
In October 2022, Illy resigned with Warner Music and released "Like You".

Personal life
In the early days of his career, Illy expressed his passion for his black VX Holden Commodore SS.

In 2021, Illy posted a video to Twitter of the 70th floor infinity pool of Australia 108 rippling as the tower swayed in high winds, However it is unknown whether he resides within the building.

Discography

 Long Story Short (2009)
 The Chase (2010)
 Bring It Back (2012)
 Cinematic (2013)
 Two Degrees (2016)
 The Space Between (2021)

Awards

AIR Awards
The Australian Independent Record Awards (commonly known informally as AIR Awards) is an annual awards night to recognise, promote and celebrate the success of Australia's Independent Music sector.

|-
| rowspan="2" | AIR Awards of 2011
| "It Can Wait"
| Best Independent Single/EP
| 
|-
| The Chase
| Best Independent Hip Hop/Urban Album
| 
|-
| AIR Awards of 2013
|Bring it Back 
| Best Independent Hip Hop/Urban Album
| 
|-

APRA Awards
The Australasian Performing Right Association Awards of 2017 (generally known as APRA Awards) are an annual awards ceremony to award outstanding achievements in contemporary songwriting, composing and publishing. Illy has won three awards from eight nominations.

|-
| rowspan="2"| 2014 || "On and On" || Urban Work of the Year || 
|-
| "Youngbloods" || Urban Work of the Year || 
|-
| 2015 || "Tightrope" (featuring Scarlett Stevens) || Urban Work of the Year || 
|-
| 2017 || "Papercuts" (featuring Vera Blue) || Urban Work of the Year || 
|-
| rowspan="2"| 2018 || "Catch 22" (featuring Anne-Marie) || Urban Work of the Year || 
|-
| "Oh My" (featuring Jenna McDougall) || Urban Work of the Year || 
|-
| rowspan="2"| 2020 || "Exit Sign" (Hilltop Hoods featuring Illy and Ecca Vandal) || Most Performed Urban Work of the Year || 
|-
| "Then What" || Most Performed Urban Work of the Year || 
|-

ARIA Awards

The ARIA Music Awards is an annual awards ceremony that recognises excellence, innovation, and achievement across all genres of Australian music. They commenced in 1987. Illy has won two trophies from nineteen nominations.

! 
|-
| 2011 || The Chase || Best Urban Album ||  || rowspan="19"|
|-
| 2013 || Bring it Back || Best Urban Album ||  
|-
| 2014 || Cinematic || Best Urban Album ||  
|-
| rowspan="6"| 2016 ||rowspan="6"| "Papercuts" || Best Male Artist ||  
|-
|  Best Pop Release ||  
|-
|  Song of the Year ||  
|-
|  Best Video ||  
|-
|  Engineer of the Year ||  
|-
|  Producer of the Year ||  
|-
| rowspan="6"| 2017 || rowspan="3"| Two Degrees || Album of the Year ||  
|-
| Best Male Artist ||  
|-
| Best Urban Album || 
|-
| "Catch 22" (featuring Anne-Marie) (directed by Mark Alston) || Best Video ||  
|-
| "Catch 22" (featuring Anne-Marie) || Song of the Year ||  
|-
| The Two Degrees Tour || Best Australian Live Act ||  
|-
| rowspan="2"| 2019 || Then What || Best Hip Hop Release ||  
|-
| "Exit Sign"(with Hilltop Hoods and Ecca Vandal) || Best Video ||  
|-
| rowspan="2"| 2020 || "Last Laugh" || Hip Hop Release ||  
|-
| "Exit Sign"(with Hilltop Hoods and Ecca Vandal) || Song of the Year||  
|-
| 2021 || M-Phazes for The Space Between || ARIA Award for Producer of the Year ||  ||  
|-

J Award
The J Awards are an annual series of Australian music awards that were established by the Australian Broadcasting Corporation's youth-focused radio station Triple J. They commenced in 2005.

|-
| J Awards of 2014
|"One for the City"
| Australian Video of the Year
|

MTV Europe Music Awards
The MTV Europe Music Awards is an award presented by Viacom International Media Networks to honour artists and music in pop culture.

|-
| 2017
| himself 
| Best Australian Act
| 
|-

References

External links
 

1986 births
APRA Award winners
ARIA Award winners
Australian hip hop musicians
Australian male rappers
Living people
Sony Music Australia artists
Rappers from Melbourne
People from Frankston, Victoria